The Fabcar FDSC/03, and its evolution, the Fabcar FDSC/03 Evo, are first-generation Daytona Prototype, designed, developed and built by American manufacturing company, Fabcar Engineering, for the Grand-Am Rolex Sports Car Series, in 2003.

References

2000s cars
Mid-engined cars
Rear-wheel-drive vehicles
Sports prototypes